The 2002 AF2 season was the third season of the AF2. It was preceded by 2001 and succeeded by 2003. The league champions were the Peoria Pirates, who defeated the Florida Firecats in ArenaCup III. This is also the first time that both conferences have the same division name (in that case, the American Conference Southern Division and the National Conference Southern Division, respectively). It is also the only season where both conferences have four divisions each, a la the 2002–present era of the NFL.

League info

Standings

 Green indicates clinched playoff berth
 Purple indicates division champion
 Grey indicates best regular season record
* The Steamwheelers were banned from the playoffs for rule violations.

Playoffs

Awards and honors

Regular season awards

ArenaCup III

ArenaCup III was the 2002 edition of the AF2's championship game, in which the National Conference Champions Florida Firecats were defeated by the American Conference Champions Peoria Pirates in Peoria, Illinois by a score of 65 to 47.

External links
 2002 af2 season
 Arena Cup III stats

Af2 seasons